The Mill (Swedish: Kvarnen) is a 1921 Swedish silent drama film directed by John W. Brunius and starring Anders de Wahl, Emmy Albiin and Gösta Cederlund. The film's sets were designed by the art director Gustaf Hallén.

Cast
 Anders de Wahl as Jacob Clausen
 Emmy Albiin as Kristina
 Bengt Lindström as 	Hans
Clara Kjellblad as Lise
 Ellen Dall as 	Anne
 Gösta Cederlund as 	Farm-hand
 Nils Lundell as 	Lise's Brother
 Gösta Hillberg as 	Forest Warden

References

Bibliography
 Hjort, Mette & Lindqvist, Ursula. A Companion to Nordic Cinema. John Wiley & Sons, 2016.
 Sadoul, Georges. Dictionary of Film Makers. University of California Press, 1972.

External links

1921 films
1921 drama films
Swedish drama films
Swedish silent feature films
Swedish black-and-white films
Films directed by John W. Brunius
1920s Swedish-language films
Silent drama films
1920s Swedish films